USS Camden has been the name of two ships in the United States Navy:

 , the former Kiel, served as a submarine tender from 1919 to 1931, then as a barracks ship during World War II.
 , a fast combat support ship, 1967–2005.

United States Navy ship names